Louis Gordon Holmes (7 July 1892 – 23 June 1915) was an Australian rules footballer who played with St Kilda in the Victorian Football League. He was killed in Gallipoli in World War I.

Family
The son of Louis Saengar Holmes (1859-1926), and Lucy Mary Holmes (-1935), née Newton, Louis Gordon Holmes was born in Launceston, Tasmania on 7 July 1892.

Football

Following his VFL career, Holmes moved to South Australia and studied at the University of Adelaide, where he received a double blue for Rowing and Australian rules football.

Death
He died on 23 June 1915, on the hospital ship H.M.H.S. Gascon, of the abdominal shrapnel wounds that he had sustained in action on 16 June 1915.

He was buried at sea on 24 June 1915, three miles from Gaba Tepe.

Commemorated
He is commemorated at the Lone Pine Cemetery near Gallipoli, Turkey.

See also
 List of Victorian Football League players who died in active service

References

Sources

 Holmesby, Russell & Main, Jim (2007). The Encyclopedia of AFL Footballers. 7th ed. Melbourne: Bas Publishing.
 Over a Precipice: Green Hill Road Accident: Motorist's Wonderful Escape, The (Adelaide) Journal, (Tuesday, 7 January 1913), p.1.
 Captain Louis Gordon Holmes, The AIF Project, UNSW Canberra.
 First World War Nominal Roll: Captain Louis Gordon Holmes, collection of the Australian War Memorial.
 First World War Embarkation Roll: Lieutenant Louis Gordon Holmes, collection of the Australian War Memorial.
 World War One Service Record: Captain Louis Gordon Holmes, at National Archives of Australia.
 Roll of Honour Circular: Captain Louis Gordon Holmes, at Australian War Memorial.
 Roll of Honour: Captain Louis Gordon Holmes, at Australian War Memorial.
 Wesley College Roll of Honour: Captain Louis Gordon Holmes.
 Virtual War Memorial Australia: Captain Louis Gordon Holmes.

External links
 
 
 Photograph: 1914 Group portrait of the original officers of the 10th Battalion prior to leaving Adelaide for Egypt, collection of the Australian War Memorial — Lieutenant Louis Gordon Holmes is third from the left in the back row.
 Photograph: Outdoor group portrait of officers of the 10th Infantry Battalion using a wagon as a grandstand to watch a battalion sports carnival at Mena Camp Egypt, Christmas 1914, collection of the Australian War Memorial — Lieutenant Louis Gordon Holmes is fourth from the right.

1892 births
1915 deaths
People educated at Wesley College (Victoria)
Australian rules footballers from Tasmania
St Kilda Football Club players
Launceston Football Club players
Australian military personnel killed in World War I